Wendte is an unincorporated community in Stanley County, in the U.S. state of South Dakota.

History
Wendte has its start in 1906 when the railroad was extended to that point. The community was named for H. S. Wendte, an early settler. A post office called Wendte was established in 1906, and remained in operation until it was discontinued in 1960.

References

Unincorporated communities in Stanley County, South Dakota
Unincorporated communities in South Dakota